Martina Navratilova was the defending champion of the singles event but lost in the semifinals of the 1989 Virginia Slims of California tennis tournament to Larisa Savchenko.

Zina Garrison won in the final 6–1, 6–2 against Savchenko.

Seeds
A champion seed is indicated in bold text while text in italics indicates the round in which that seed was eliminated.

  Martina Navratilova (semifinals)
  Natasha Zvereva (semifinals)
  Zina Garrison (champion)
  Larisa Savchenko (final)
  Patty Fendick (quarterfinals)
  Elna Reinach (first round)
  Nathalie Tauziat (quarterfinals)
  Rosalyn Fairbank (first round)

Draw

References
 1989 Virginia Slims of California Draw

Silicon Valley Classic
1989 WTA Tour